The 4th constituency of Var (French: Quatrième circonscription du Var) is a French legislative constituency in the Var department. Like the other 576 French constituencies, it elects one deputy using the two-round system, with a runoff if no candidate receives over 50% of the vote in the first round.

Description
The 4th constituency of Var lies to the east of Toulon along the coast.

Between 1998 and 2017 the seat continually elected centre-right deputy Jean-Michel Couve to the National Assembly.

Assembly Members

Election results

2022

 
 
 
|-
| colspan="8" bgcolor="#E9E9E9"|
|-

2017

 
 
 
 
 
 
|-
| colspan="8" bgcolor="#E9E9E9"|
|-

2012

 
 
 
 
 
|-
| colspan="8" bgcolor="#E9E9E9"|
|-

2007

 
 
 
 
 
 
 
|-
| colspan="8" bgcolor="#E9E9E9"|
|-

2002

 
 
 
 
|-
| colspan="8" bgcolor="#E9E9E9"|
|-

1997

 
 
 
 
 
 
|-
| colspan="8" bgcolor="#E9E9E9"|
|-

References

4